Nathaniel Nwosu (born 10 January 2006) is a Nigerian footballer who plays as a goalkeeper for Water F.C. and the Nigerian national team.

Career

Early career
Nwosu is a product of the Water FC Academy in Abuja. Nwosu had started playing football as a defender but switched to playing as a goalkeeper at 11 years-old. He won the  ‘golden gloves’ award for the best goalkeeper at the 2022 WAFU Zone B U-20 Tournament as he represented Nigeria at the tournament in which they triumphed overall. Nwosu was praised for his 6ft 4” height and reach, he was also praised for his reflexes and agility. He was named in the team of the tournament.

2022: Full international
Nwosu was called into the Nigerian squad for the 2022 African Nations Championship qualification matches against Ghana played in August and September 2022. In October 2022 he played as Nigeria reached the final round of the 2023 Africa U23 Cup of Nations with a 2-0 (and 3-1 aggregate) victory of Tanzania U23.

In November 2022 he was called up to the Nigeria squad for a pre-World Cup friendly match away against Costa Rica and made his senior international on November 10, 2022 debut appearing as a substitute against Costa Rica.

2023: AFCON U20
In January 2023 Nwosu was called back in to the Nigerian under-20 team as they looked to qualify for the 2023 FIFA U-20 World Cup. He started the opening match of the AFCON U20 tournament for Nigeria against Senegal. played the opening game of the AFCON U20 tournament against Senegal in February 2023 but was dropped for their second match against Egypt.

Career statistics

International

References

External links

 

2006 births
Living people
Nigerian footballers
Association football goalkeepers